Procrica parisii is a species of moth of the family Tortricidae. It is found in Ethiopia.

The wingspan is about 22 mm. The ground colour of the forewings is cream, with brownish strigulation (fine streaks) and brown markings with rust suffusions. The hindwings are cream grey, tinged with brownish apically.

Etymology
The species is named for Mr Francesco Parisi who collected the species.

References

Moths described in 2010
Archipini